Anna Larionova (born 3 June 1975) is a retired Russian alpine skier who competed in the 1998 Winter Olympics.

External links
 sports-reference.com

1975 births
Living people
Russian female alpine skiers
Olympic alpine skiers of Russia
Alpine skiers at the 1998 Winter Olympics
Universiade medalists in alpine skiing
Sportspeople from Saint Petersburg
Universiade gold medalists for Russia
Competitors at the 1995 Winter Universiade
20th-century Russian women